Ormeniș is a commune in Brașov County, Transylvania, Romania. It is composed of a single village, Ormeniș. It also included Augustin village until 2005, when that village was split off to form a separate commune.

It sits on the left bank of the Olt River, which forms the border with Covasna County to the east and to the north. It neighbors Apața commune to the south and Racoș commune to the west. 

The Ormeniș train station serves Line 300 of the CFR network, which connects Bucharest with the Hungarian border near Oradea.

At the 2011 census, 43.3% of inhabitants were Roma, 39.3% Hungarians and 17.3% Romanians.

References

Communes in Brașov County
Localities in Transylvania
Romani communities in Romania